Nilantha Jayawardena (also known as D. P. Nilantha Jayawardena) is a Senior Deputy Inspector-General of Police in Sri Lanka and Chief of State Intelligence Service (Sri Lanka).

Early life and education
Nilantha was educated at Nalanda College Colombo.

Senior DIG Jayawardena holds a Bachelor of Commerce degree, a Business Management Postgraduate Degree and a Diploma in Conflict Resolution

Nilantha is the youngest DIG in Sri Lanka Police history

Career
Nilantha Jayawardena joined Sri Lanka Police as Assistant Superintendent of Police

References

 Eight Acting DIGs can’t wear right uniform
 Nilantha Jayawardena Becomes New Intelligence Chief
 Police warned of the impending threat to peace and normalcy in the Ilavalai Police Area
 රාජ්‍ය බුද්ධි අංශයේ ලොකු පුටුව නිලන්තට

Alumni of Nalanda College, Colombo
Sinhalese police officers
Sri Lankan Buddhists
Living people
Year of birth missing (living people)